Georg C. Klaren (1900–1962) was an Austrian screenwriter and film director. He worked on a number of screenplays with Herbert Juttke during the silent and early sound eras including Alfred Hitchcock's 1931 film Mary. After the Second World War, Klaren became the head dramaturge at the East German state-owned studio DEFA.

Selected filmography

Screenwriter
 Nanette Makes Everything (1926)
 Department Store Princess (1926)
 I Liked Kissing Women (1926)
 Assassination (1927)
 The Transformation of Dr. Bessel (1927)
 Flirtation (1927)
 Casanova's Legacy (1928)
Sex in Chains (1928)
 Fair Game (1928)
 The Lady and the Chauffeur (1928)
 Odette (1928)
A Knight in London (1929)
Kolonne X (1929)
 The Lord of the Tax Office (1929)
 Somnambul (1929)
 Devotion (1929)
 Cagliostro (1929)
 Marriage in Trouble (1929)
 Perjury  (1929)
 Peter the Mariner (1929)
 The Right of the Unborn (1929)
The Hound of the Baskervilles (1929)
 Busy Girls (1930)
 Oh Those Glorious Old Student Days (1930)
 Elisabeth of Austria (1931)
The Lovers of Midnight (1931)
Mary (1931)
 Madame Bluebeard  (1931)
 Gloria (1931)
 Chauffeur Antoinette (1932)
 Antoinette (1932)
The Love Contract (1932)
 The Secret of Johann Orth (1932)
 Three from the Unemployment Office (1932)
 A Woman Like You (1933)
 There Is Only One Love (1933)
 Frasquita (1934)
 Pillars of Society (1935)
 The Cossack and the Nightingale (1935)
Ave Maria (1936)
 A Woman Between Two Worlds (1936)
 Shadows of the Past (1936)
 The Love of the Maharaja (1936)
The Chief Witness (1937)
Heimweh (1937)
 The Beaver Coat (1937)
 The False Step (1939)
Clarissa (1941)
 Doctor Crippen (1942)
Voyage Without Hope (1943)
 Love's Carnival (1955)

Director
 Manolescu, Prince of Thieves (1933)
Wozzeck (1947)
Semmelweis – Retter der Mütter (1950)
Die Sonnenbrucks (1951)
Call Over the Air (1951) 
Karriere in Paris (1952)
Daughter of the Regiment (1953)

References

Bibliography
 McGilligan, Patrick. Alfred Hitchcock: A Life in Darkness and Light. HarperCollins, 2004.

External links

1900 births
1962 deaths
Austrian male screenwriters
Austrian film directors
Dramaturges
Film people from Vienna
20th-century dramatists and playwrights
20th-century Austrian male writers
20th-century Austrian screenwriters